Abdul Razak is a South African cricketer. He made his First-class debut for Dolphins in the 2005-2006 Supersport Series on 23 March 2006. He made his List A debut for a South Africa Academy side against Zimbabwe A on 28 August 2007. He made his Twenty20 debut for KwaZulu-Natal in the 2011-2012 CSA Provincial T20 Challenge on 2 October 2011.

References

External links
 

1987 births
Living people
South African cricketers
Boost Defenders cricketers
KwaZulu-Natal cricketers